Will Thomas, born 1958 in Bucks County, Pennsylvania, is a novelist who writes a Victorian mystery series featuring Cyrus Barker, a Scottish detective or "private enquiry agent," and his Welsh assistant, Thomas Llewelyn.  The Barker/Llewelyn novels are set in the 1880s and often feature historical events, people, and movements.  Martial combat is a recurring theme throughout this hardboiled series.  In interviews, Thomas has said that Barker is based on men such as Richard Francis Burton and Edward William Barton-Wright, founder of Bartitsu.

Prior to writing novels, Will Thomas wrote essays for Sherlock Holmes society publications and lectured on crime fiction of the Victorian era.

Will Thomas' first novel was nominated for a Barry Award and a Shamus Award, and won the 2005 Oklahoma Book Award.  He has been employed as a librarian with the Tulsa City-County Library System, and featured on the cover of Library Journal.  The Black Hand was nominated for a 2009 Shamus Award.  Fatal Enquiry won the 2015 Oklahoma Book Award.

Will Thomas is a great fan of Rex Stout, author of the Nero Wolfe mysteries. Thomas studies Victorian martial arts such as Bartitsu and Hung Gar, which he uses in his novels.

Books

Barker & Llewelyn Novels 
Some Danger Involved (2004)
To Kingdom Come (2005)
The Limehouse Text (2006)
The Hellfire Conspiracy (2007)
The Black Hand (2008)
Fatal Enquiry (2014)
Anatomy of Evil (2015)
Hell Bay (2016)
Old Scores (2017)
"An Awkward Way to Die", short story (2017)
Blood Is Blood (2018)
Lethal Pursuit (November 12, 2019)
Dance with Death (April 13, 2021)
Fierce Poison (April 12, 2022)

Sherlock Holmes Short Stories 

 "The Adventure of Urquhart Manse", in The MX Book of New Sherlock Holmes Stories - Part I (2015)
 "Take Up and Read!", in The MX Book of New Sherlock Holmes Stories - Part XIII (2019)

Notes

References
Wilda Williams, "Librarians who write thrive on how well their chosen careers complement one another", Library Journal, February 15, 2004.
Alex Knapp, "Series Review: The Barker-Llewelyn Novels by Will Thomas", Heretical Ideas, October 23, 2008
Joe Myers, "Oklahoma Author of the Month: Will Thomas", Oklahoma Center for Poets and Writers (author interview).

External links
Official website

1958 births
Living people
21st-century American novelists
American male novelists
American mystery writers
People from Broken Arrow, Oklahoma
People from Bucks County, Pennsylvania
Novelists from Oklahoma
Novelists from Pennsylvania
21st-century American male writers